Owen Jones (born 8 August 1984) is a British newspaper columnist, political commentator, journalist, author, and left-wing activist. He writes a column for The Guardian and contributes to the New Statesman and Tribune. He has two weekly web series, The Owen Jones Show, and The Owen Jones Podcast. He was previously a columnist for The Independent.

Early life and education
Jones was born in Sheffield, South Yorkshire and grew up in Stockport, Greater Manchester and briefly in Falkirk. His father, Rob Jones, was a local authority worker and trade union shop steward, and his mother, Ruth Aylett, is a professor of computer science (initially at the University of Salford and currently Heriot-Watt University). His paternal grandparents were from North Wales and his father began learning English at the age of six. He has a twin sister, Eleanor, and two older brothers, Ben and Mark. He describes himself as a "fourth-generation socialist"; his grandfather was involved with the Communist Party of Great Britain and his parents met as members of the Trotskyist Militant group.

Jones attended Bramhall High School and Ridge Danyers Sixth Form College and studied history at University College, Oxford, graduating with a BA in 2005 and a Master of Studies in US History in 2007. Before entering journalism, he worked as a trade union lobbyist and a parliamentary researcher for the Labour Party MP John McDonnell. At one point he was also hired by the historian Eric Hobsbawm to index and archive his papers.

Writings and public career

Columnist, broadcaster and writer

Jones is a weekly columnist for The Guardian after switching from The Independent in March 2014. His work has appeared in the New Statesman, the Sunday Mirror, Le Monde diplomatique and several publications with lower circulations. He writes from a left-wing perspective.

In 2011, Jones published his first book, Chavs: The Demonization of the Working Class, dissecting cultural stereotypes of the British working-class as boorish and anti-social "chavs". The book was selected by critic Dwight Garner of The New York Times as one of his top 10 non-fiction books of 2011, and it was long-listed for the Guardian First Book Award.

The Independent on Sunday named Jones as one of its top 50 Britons of 2011, for the manner in which his book raised the profile of class-based issues. In November 2012, Jones was awarded Journalist of the Year at the Stonewall Awards, along with The Times journalist Hugo Rifkind. Jones' second book, The Establishment: And How They Get Away With It, was published in September 2014.

The Daily Telegraph placed Jones 7th in its 2013 list of Britain's most influential left-wingers. In February 2013, when Jones was awarded the Young Writer of the Year prize at the Political Book Award, he donated half the £3,000 prize money to support the campaign of Lisa Forbes, a Labour parliamentary candidate, and the other half to Disabled People Against Cuts.

In an interview with The Student Journals, Jones commented that some have accused him of using politics only to raise his own profile and that he risks being seen as a "lefty rent-a-gob".

Jones spoke at a press conference to launch the People's Assembly Against Austerity on 26 March 2013, and regional public meetings in the lead-up to a national meeting at Central Hall Westminster on 22 June 2013. In November 2013, he delivered the Royal Television Society's Huw Wheldon Memorial Lecture, Totally Shameless: How TV Portrays the Working Class.

In 2013 Jones praised Hugo Chavez and his handling of the Venezuelan economy, and criticised characterisations of Venezuela as a dictatorship. In 2014 he reaffirmed his belief in Venezuela's democracy. As the economic crisis and unrest in Venezuela intensified, Jones was criticised for his support of the Venezuelan government.

Jones is a republican.

Jones' television appearances include Jeremy Vine, Politics Live, Good Morning Britain and University Challenge.

YouTube show and podcast
In December 2020, Jones began hosting a weekly web series, The Owen Jones Show, where he talks to guests from across the political spectrum. New episodes are uploaded to his YouTube channel every Sunday. He also launched The Owen Jones Podcast the following month, with guests including Stewart Lee, Noam Chomsky, Michael Sheen and Chelsea Manning.

2019 assault 
In August 2019, Jones and his friends were attacked outside a London pub. In January 2020, one of the three attackers was found guilty of aggravated assault, with the judge concluding that Jones, who is gay, was targeted for his LGBT identity and left-wing beliefs; the other two perpetrators were convicted of affray.

Honours 
In 2012, Jones was Stonewall Journalist of the Year and in 2013, he was Political Book Awards Young Writer of the Year.

In 2015, Jones was awarded the Honorary Degree of Doctor of the University (DUniv) by Staffordshire University.

In November 2021, Jones received an LGBTQ Mental Health Award from charity Mind Out LGBTQ.

Books

References

External links

 Articles in The Guardian
 Articles in the New Statesman

 Articles in The Independent
 YouTube channel
 

1984 births
Living people
Alumni of University College, Oxford
British media critics
British political commentators
English atheists
English columnists
English humanists
English male non-fiction writers
English non-fiction writers
English republicans
English social commentators
English socialists
English people of Welsh descent
European democratic socialists
Gay journalists
English gay writers
English LGBT journalists
Labour Party (UK) people
British opinion journalists
People educated at Bramhall High School
Writers from Sheffield
People from Stockport
The Guardian journalists
The Independent people
Victims of anti-LGBT hate crimes